Asian Highway 81 (AH81) is a road in the Asian Highway Network running 1143 km (714 miles) from Larsi, Georgia to Baku, Azerbaijan, with ferry connection to Aktau, Kazakhstan. The route is as follows:

Georgia
 S3 Highway: Larsi - Natakhtari
 S1 Highway: Natakhtari - Mtskheta
 S9 Highway: Mtskheta - Tbilisi - Rustavi
 S4 Highway: Rustavi - Tbilisi
 S6 Highway: Tbilisi - Marneuli
 S7 Highway: Marneuli - Sadakhlo

Armenia
 : Dzoramut - Vanadzor - Ashtarak
 : Ashtarak - Yerevan
 : Yerevan - Yereskh

Azerbaijan
  R63 Road: Sadarak
 M7 Highway: Sədərək - Nakhchivan
 M8 Highway: Nakhchivan - Julfa - Ordubad - Kilit
Branch   R65 Road: Julfa - Jolfa

Armenia
  M-2 Highway: Agarak - Meghri
  M-17 Highway: Meghri - Nrnadzor
  H-49 Road: Nrnadzor - Aghband

Azerbaijan
(under  Republic of Artsakh control) M6 Highway: Aghband - Mərcanlı
 M6 Highway: Goradiz - Hajiqabul
 M2 Highway: Hajiqabul - Ələt - Baku

Kazakhstan
: Baku - Aktau

Asian Highway Network

Roads in Georgia (country)
Roads in Armenia
Roads in Azerbaijan
Roads in Kazakhstan